Leukotriene C4 synthase is an enzyme that in humans is encoded by the LTC4S gene.

The protein encoded by this gene, LTC4S (or glutathione S-transferase II) is an enzyme that converts leukotriene A4 and glutathione to create leukotriene C4. This is a member of MAPEG family of transmembrane proteins.  A trimer of Leukotriene C4 synthase is localized on the outer nuclear membrane and endoplasmic reticulum, where it forms a complex with 5-Lipoxygenase-activating protein.  This protein is remotely related to microsomal glutathione S-transferase.

Function 

The MAPEG (Membrane-Associated Proteins in Eicosanoid and Glutathione metabolism) family includes a number of human proteins, several of which are involved the production of leukotrienes. This gene encodes an enzyme that catalyzes the first step in the biosynthesis of cysteinyl leukotrienes, potent biological compounds derived from arachidonic acid. Leukotrienes have been implicated as mediators of anaphylaxis and inflammatory conditions such as human bronchial asthma. This protein localizes to the nuclear envelope and adjacent endoplasmic reticulum.

References

Further reading

External links
 
  - Eicosanoid and Glutathione metabolism protein family (MAPEG)

Transmembrane proteins